The 2006 Porsche Tennis Grand Prix was a women's tennis tournament played on indoor hard courts that was part of the Tier II category of the 2006 WTA Tour. The event was relocated to the Porsche-Arena in Stuttgart, Germany after having held all previous editions in Filderstadt. It was the 29th edition of the tournament and was played from 2 October until 8 October 2006. Fourth-seeded Nadia Petrova won the singles title and earned $100,000 first-prize money.

Finals

Singles
 Nadia Petrova defeated  Tatiana Golovin 6–3, 7–6(7–4)
 It was Petrova's 5th singles title of the year and the 6th of her career.

Doubles
 Lisa Raymond /  Samantha Stosur defeated  Cara Black /   Rennae Stubbs 6–3, 6–4

Prize money

References

External links
 ITF tournament edition details
 Tournament draws

Porsche Tennis Grand Prix
Porsche Tennis Grand Prix
2006 in German tennis
2000s in Baden-Württemberg
Porsch